Jerry H. Dean is a Canadian politician, who was elected to the Newfoundland and Labrador House of Assembly in the 2015 provincial election. He represented the electoral district of Exploits as a member of the Liberal Party until his loss in the 2019 election.

Prior to his election to the legislature, Dean was the mayor of Botwood.

References

Living people
Liberal Party of Newfoundland and Labrador MHAs
Mayors of places in Newfoundland and Labrador
People from Botwood
21st-century Canadian politicians
Year of birth missing (living people)